Burton is a city in Genesee County in the state of Michigan and a suburb of Flint. The population was 29,999 at the 2010 census, making Burton the second largest city in Genesee County.

Neighborhoods
 Belsay is on Belsay Road at the rail track north of I-69 and Court Street and south of Davison Road..
 Lapeer Heights is at Belsay Road and Roberta Road and south of Lapeer Road..

History
Although there were Native Americans and trappers whom lived on land earlier, and even some who attempted to settle by there, many of the original settlers of Burton came from the towns of Adams and Henderson in Jefferson County, New York. 
For 20 years, this area was known as the Atherton settlement, after brothers Shubael and Perus Atherton and nephew Pliny Atherton Skinner (and later joined by another brother, Adonijah), who settled on the Thread Creek in 1835. Atherton descendants still live in Burton in 2014.

Township
The City of Burton was organized as Burton Township, in 1855. Burton Township had first been a part of Flint Township. The North part of Burton was part of Kearsley Township along with the Southern part of Genesee Township from 1839 until 1843 when the township was merged back (for school purposes) into Flint Township. When the City of Flint incorporated, Burton Township was separated from Flint Township by the Genesee County Board of Supervisors on October 12, 1855, although the first township meeting did not take place until April 7, 1856, which is sometimes taken as the actual date of organization. On December 13, 1861, a post office was opened with Horace L. Donelson as postmaster and only operated until August 6 of the next year.

Over the years, large portions of the northern and western sides of the township were annexed by the City of Flint for revenues.

City
On May 16, 1972, township residents voted to incorporate and the City of Burton was officially formed July 1 of that year. Burton began receiving Karegnondi Water Authority water treated by Genesee County Drain Commission Water and Waste Division on December 15, 2017.

Geography

Demographics

2020 census 
As of the census of 2020, there were 29,715 people, 12,275 households, and 7,433 families living in the city. The racial makeup of the city was 83.8% White, 8.8% African American, 0.4% Native American, 1.4% Asian, 1.3% from other races, and 4.4% from two or more races. Hispanic or Latino of any race were 4.2% of the population.

There were 12,275 households, of which 22.7% had children under the age of 18 living with them, 39.5% were married couples living together, 16.8% had a female householder with no husband present, 4.3% had a male householder with no wife present. 31.7% of all households were made up of individuals, and 12.3% had someone living alone who was 65 years of age or older. The average household size was 2.40 and the average family was 2.98.

The median age of the city was 42.6. 21.2% of residents were under the age of 18; 8.9% were between the ages of  18 and 24; 23.7% were from 25 to 44; 28.7% were from 45 to 64; and 17.5% were 65 years of age or older. The gender makeup of the city was 46.8% male and 53.2% female.

2010 census
As of the census of 2010, there were 29,999 people, 11,964 households, and 8,041 families living in the city. The racial makeup of the city was 88.1% White, 7.3% African American, 0.6% Native American, 0.6% Asian, 0.7% from other races, and 2.5% from two or more races. Hispanic or Latino of any race were 3.1% of the population.

There were 11,964 households, of which 33.1% had children under the age of 18 living with them, 45.2% were married couples living together, 16.3% had a female householder with no husband present, 5.7% had a male householder with no wife present, and 32.8% were non-families. 27.0% of all households were made up of individuals, and 10.3% had someone living alone who was 65 years of age or older. The average household size was 2.50 and the average family size was 3.00.

The median age in the city was 38.6 years. 24% of residents were under the age of 18; 8.8% were between the ages of 18 and 24; 25.9% were from 25 to 44; 28% were from 45 to 64; and 13.2% were 65 years of age or older. The gender makeup of the city was 48.8% male and 51.2% female.

2000 census
As of the census of 2000, there were 30,308 people, 11,699 households, and 8,165 families living in the city. The racial makeup of the city was 92.09% White, 3.55% African American, 0.76% Native American, 0.74% Asian, 0.03% Pacific Islander, 0.81% from other races, and 2.04% from two or more races. Hispanic or Latino of any race were 2.33% of the population.

There were 11,699 households, out of which 35.0% had children under the age of 18 living with them, 51.8% were married couples living together, 12.8% had a female householder with no husband present, and 30.2% were non-families. 25.3% of all households were made up of individuals, and 9.0% had someone living alone who was 65 years of age or older. The average household size was 2.58 and the average family size was 3.08.

In the city, the population was spread out, with 27.4% under the age of 18, 8.4% from 18 to 24, 32.0% from 25 to 44, 21.0% from 45 to 64, and 11.2% who were 65 years of age or older. The median age was 35 years. For every 100 females, there were 95.8 males. For every 100 females age 18 and over, there were 92.7 males.

The median income for a household in the city was $44,050, and the median income for a family was $50,332. Males had a median income of $41,433 versus $27,601 for females. The per capita income for the city was $20,548. About 5.5% of families and 8.7% of the population were below the poverty line, including 8.6% of those under age 18 and 9.5% of those age 65 or over.

Climate

This climatic region is typified by large seasonal temperature differences, with warm to hot (and often humid) summers and cold (sometimes severely cold) winters. According to the Köppen Climate Classification system, Burton has a humid continental climate, abbreviated "Dfb" on climate maps.

Notable people 

 Sumner Howard, politician and jurist in Michigan and Arizona
 Froggy Fresh, musician 
 Nick Khouri, economic advisor and 46th Treasurer of Michigan
 Jill Parr, contemporary Christian musician
 Nedra Pickler, journalist
 Dan Skuta, NFL linebacker
 Paula Zelenko, politician

References

External links
City of Burton
A History of Burton from History of Genesee county, Michigan. With illustrations and biographical sketches of its prominent men and pioneers, Ellis, Franklin, 1828–1885.

Cities in Genesee County, Michigan
Populated places established in 1855
1855 establishments in Michigan